Scoloposcelis is a genus of minute pirate bugs in the family Lyctocoridae. There are about seven described species in Scoloposcelis.

Species
These seven species belong to the genus Scoloposcelis:
 Scoloposcelis basilica Drake and Harris, 1926 i c g
 Scoloposcelis flavicornis Reuter, 1871 i c g b
 Scoloposcelis koreanus Jung & Yamada g
 Scoloposcelis obscurella (Zetterstedt, 1838) g
 Scoloposcelis parallela (Motschulsky, 1863) g
 Scoloposcelis pulchella (Zetterstedt, 1838) i c g b
 Scoloposcelis seidaii g
Data sources: i = ITIS, c = Catalogue of Life, g = GBIF, b = Bugguide.net

References

Further reading

External links

 

Lyctocoridae genera
Articles created by Qbugbot
Lyctocoridae